We Are the Night is a 2010 German vampire horror film directed by Dennis Gansel, starring Karoline Herfurth and Nina Hoss. The film deals with a young woman who gets bitten by a female vampire and drawn into her world. She falls in love with a young police officer who investigates a murder case involving the vampires. The film explores themes of depression, self-harm, the consequences of immortality, suicide, and explores Valerie Solanas' idea of an all-female society.

Plot
Lena, a young criminal, lurks near a cash dispenser. Just as her victim has used the machine, she pickpockets his credit card, but moments later her mark is arrested by the police. She flees, but a police officer, Tom, chases after her and eventually catches up with her on a bridge. After a short conversation, he tries to arrest her, but Lena hits him in the face, kicks him between the legs and jumps off the bridge onto a passing boat.

Later that evening, Lena goes to a nightclub, which is run by Louise. Inside the club, Louise dances with Lena and offers her a drink. When Lena goes to the bathroom, Louise follows and bites her. The terrified Lena runs home. When she awakes in the morning, the sun burns her and she craves blood. Lena returns to the club to confront Louise about what has happened. She meets Louise's two companions, the stoic Charlotte and the cheerful Nora. On Charlotte's suggestion, the women sell Lena to some Russian pimps to force her to accept her new state of being (the word "vampire" is never mentioned in the film).  Lena attacks one of the mobsters as he tries to rape her, but she is shot by another pimp wielding a shotgun. The women enter the compound and kills the pimps but fail to notice one mobster hiding in fear. Before leaving, Nora steals one of the mobster's Lamborghini.

When Lena awakes at the hotel, Louise gives her a glass of what appears to be blood. As Lena drinks, she feels her strength return. Louise bathes Lena and tells her the story of how she was changed. At first she hated her maker, but grew to love her after traveling throughout Europe and getting to know all the benefits of the immortal life. After her maker was killed by sunlight, Louise wanted to commit suicide to join her, but instead began searching for a new companion. As Lena bathes, her short hair grows and returns to its natural color, her piercing falls out and she loses all bruises and wounds (including a tattoo on her belly).

Lena spends a night shopping, partying and having fun with the women who give her the stolen Lamborghini. As the night comes to an end, the women return to their hotel to perform their morning ritual: allowing the first rays of sun burn their skin but retreating inside before any lasting harm can be done. Louise kisses Lena, which startles and confuses Lena who bites Louise's lip, before she interrupts herself and begins cursing her hastiness.

The next night when Lena returns home to pick up some belongings, she is met by Tom, who used a file on Lena to find her home address. The two have coffee and talk, but when Lena suddenly sees Louise approaching, she uses her Lamborghini to retreat to the nightclub. She finds Charlotte in a private room where Charlotte tells Lena that she was a silent movie actress in the 1920s and that she had a husband and daughter. Louise enters the room and asks Lena why she is acting different. Lena lies that she misses the sun, so Louise takes the girls to Tropical Islands Resort that has artificial sunlight allowing them to have a pool party "in the sun". Two night watchmen find the girls and Nora convinces the men to join them in the pool. Lena is concerned they are going to harm them, but Louise gives Lena her word they will not hurt the men. However, Nora quickly kills off one of them, but the other tries to escape. Charlotte sadistically kills this man and Lena flees the scene in terror.

Tom and his partner, Lummer, interrogate the surviving mobster who says that the devil killed his friends and stole his Lamborghini. Tom realizes that the stolen car is the car he saw Lena drive. The SEK (German SWAT unit) storms the hotel and in the chaos, Nora dies when she is exposed to the sun.

The three remaining women escapes and hide at the abandoned Teufelsberg and prepare to flee to Russia. Before leaving, Charlotte demands to see her elderly daughter, whom Charlotte sings a lullaby to as she dies. With a whole day before their departure to Russia the girls return to their hideout to perform their morning ritual. As the sun rises, Charlotte locks Lena and Louise inside and allows the sun to kill her.

Lena goes to Tom to say goodbye and forces him to shoot her and the wound heals in front of his eyes to show her true nature. Lena begins to cry while Tom holds her and they fall asleep. Lummer, who has suspected Tom of having some involvement with the women since the hotel attack, has the SEK incarcerate them. Louise goes to the watchmen while they're in the shower and kills them. Louise asks Lena through an intercom how she would manage to live with a man destined to die, herself knowing the pain of losing a loved one. Louise kidnaps Tom and Lena follows her. At Teufelsberg, Louise wants Lena to tell her, "I love you". Lena does so and Louise says that that's the most beautiful lie she's ever heard and shoots Tom. Louise and Lena have a fight and Lena throws Louise into the sunlight, where she dies with a peaceful smile. Lena runs to Tom and wants to bite him, but stops, kisses him and begins to cry.

At the end the SEK arrives with Lummer. Lena and Tom are gone with no trace other than Louise's gun. Lummer looks outside and whispers "Good luck" and walks away from the scene.

Cast

Background

Dennis Gansel originally wrote the script back in 1999. Then called The Dawn, the plot dealt with a love story between a Berlin vampire and a mortal. He pitched the movie to Nina Hoss, who became very enthusiastic and wanted to do the film right away. The script was in development hell for several years. First Franka Potente was going to direct, but with the flop of Creep, no one wanted to invest in German horror films. Gansel almost gave up hope until the release and success of Twilight sparked a wave of vampire films, and the success of Gansel's The Wave gave him free hands. Due to the similarities between the original script and Twilight, Gansel had Jan Berger rewrite the script, now under the title Wir sind die Nacht. Thinking that an ordinary love story was no longer in place with the boom of star crossed vampire/human relationships Gansel imagined a darker twist on the subject was more in order. He came up with a new, darker love story and took Carmilla as inspiration as he thought while Dracula had been done to death, no one had really made a serious attempt on Carmilla. Karoline Herfurth was shown the script back in 2000, but she was too young to play Lena, so Gansel promised her the role of Nora. But as production was delayed, Herfurth became old enough to play the part of Lena. Instead Anna Fischer was cast as Nora, who in the eye of producer Christian Becker was the perfect choice because she looked like a party girl. Jennifer Ulrich auditioned 4 times before being cast as Charlotte.

Shooting began October 11, 2009 and ended on December 16.

The setting of the club scene was an old bathhouse. The pool was unheated and therefore all the actors and extras had to play the scene in the cold. The exterior shots of the club came in a deserted theme park in the Berlin district of Treptow-Köpenick, and Spree in the park. Due to the tight budget and not being able to afford too many shooting days, five cameras were rolling at the same time. The film was shot on 35 mm using Arriflex 235 and 435 cameras.

Most of the stunts in the film were done by the actresses themselves. Wolfgang Hohlbein wrote a novel tie-in, which differs significantly from the final film.

Soundtrack
The film's score was composed by Heiko Maille and performed by the Deutsches Filmorchester Babelsberg. The soundtrack album, released as an MP3 download and on CD, features the majority of the songs and parts of the score. One song, "Pleased to meet you" by Wolfmother, was featured in the film, but is not on the soundtrack. Heiko Maile was inspired by the score of the film The Dark Knight and how it combined electronic music with orchestra music and electric guitar. Maile used "Au Clair De La Lune" as Charlotte's theme. Sven Hack performed the sad clarinet solos that appear throughout the film.

 "Self-fulfilling Prophecy" – Scala & Kolacny Brothers
 "In Our Eyes" (Anthony Mills Soundtrack Version) − Moonbootica
 "Wir sind die Nacht" − Covenant
 "Charlotte's Death (Au Clair De La Lune)" (Score) − Heiko Maile
 "Nightlife" − IAMX
 "Lena's Metamorphosis" (Score) − Heiko Maile
 "Cold Song" − Klaus Nomi
 "Escape From The Hotel (Suite)" (Score) − Heiko Maile
 "Dumpfe Träume (WSDN Remix)" − Xenia Beliayeva
 "Miserable Girl (Nite Version)" − Soulwax
 "Tief in der Nacht" − DJ Valero
 "IERS" − Dirk Blümlein Terzett
 "Land Of The Free" − Warren Suicide
 "Farewell My Child" (score) − Heiko Maile
 "Pretty When You Cry" − VAST
 "Russian Whorehouse (Suite)" (score) − Heiko Maile
 "Big And Bad (WSDN Edit)" − Gabriel Le Mar

The complete score was released as an MP3 download on Amazon.de and the German iTunes Store.

Alternative endings
Two other endings were shot for this film, like with Gansel's previous film The Wave. Both were discarded to bring a more ambiguous ending to the film.

The first alternative ending plays out almost like the final ending. It continues after Lena starts to cry and shows her running away into the subway station leaving Tom behind. She stops and looks behind her before starting to run again.

In the second ending however, Lena finds Tom dying from his wound and bites him, turning him into a vampire. After delivering the bite, Lena flies backwards, crashing into the wall much like Louise did when she bit her. Lena whispers "Forgive me," as Tom rises on his feet. The camera moves away as they look at each other.

Critical reception

German newspaper Die Welt praised the film and said it had rescued the vampire genre from the likes of Twilight, True Blood and The Vampire Diaries. The critic noted the film having a similar theme of Gansel's earlier films Die Welle and Before the Fall about the seduction of youth and also dealt with hedonism and obsession with youth. The critic praised the multiple levels and themes of the film and that Berlin was used as much more than a setting, almost a cipher. The critic also noted Gansel's decision to use female leads and felt he had a lot of empathy for them.

The film was nominated for Best Editing and Best Film score at the 2011 German Film Awards. It was awarded the Special Jury Award at the 43rd Sitges Film Festival. About.com awarded the film with 4 stars and named it the best vampire film of the year. New York Times gave a negative review and called the film neither romantic or chilling. Twitchfilm.com praised the visuals and effects but was most enthusiastic about the lead characters. He compared that unlike films like Lesbian Vampire Killers, the film explored Louise's lesbian desire from a romantic and humanist perspective. The reviewer concluded by writing "There are no bad guys here, just misunderstood ones, so the way Lena concludes this is strange and unsettling. I really wanted to spend more time with this group, the film only touches upon what they have been through and feel, but regardless I highly recommend this."

Crave Online's reviewer wrote that "The vampires on display here are tragic creatures, certainly, but also fun-loving homicidal maniacs. The movie has action, gore and genuine drama to spare. It’s the best vampire movie since Let The Right One In, and if given the choice to watch either film over and over again I’d pick We Are The Night every time, because it’s fun as hell." He went on to give the film the score 8.5/10. Hoollywood News gave the film four stars, commenting that the second part of the film was more satisfying than the first part, that the special effects where not spectacular but that was not needed due to the extremely strong script. The reviewer praised the acting as top-notch and stated the film was just as good as vampire classics like Near Dark and Let the Right One In.

MoreHorror.com's Marcey Papandrea compared the film favourably to The Lost Boys and Near Dark and praised the acting of Herfurth, Hoss, Ulrich and Fischer, and noted that especially Nina Hoss was pitched perfect for the role. He noted that Max Riemelt was left without much to do in the film with his character but thought he did what he could with his spare material. He concluded by stating "There isn't much to complain about here, it is a fun and interesting film, a breath of fresh air in an over done subgenre".

One Metal named the film one of the best modern vampire films and gave it a 4/5 score, but commented that the pacing was uneven, especially in the climax.

Like many other critics who reviewed the film, Fearnet commented that We Are the Night lacked in originality borrowing themes and elements from films like Near Dark and Interview with the Vampire but the execution of these themes and elements were extremely well done and the lack of originality was made up for by energy and execution. Fearnet ended up recommending the film but not praising it. Brutal as Hell made similar comments, but ended up being more positive stating the "borrowed" elements where already established tropes of vampire fiction. The reviewer praised the script and the acting and the well developed mythology of the vampire stating that the decade long work on the film showed of in well fleshed out characters and mythology.

Trash City named it one of the 10 best films of 2011 (despite being a 2010 film).

Jennifer Ulrich was given the award Best Interpretation New Talent at Horror Fantasy Awards.

The film holds a 62% approval rating on Rotten Tomatoes. Jennifer Ulrich was generally praised for her performance as Charlotte.

The film was screened at MIX Copenhagen, an LGBT-film festival.

Box office
We Are the Night underperformed in German cinemas. Dennis Gansel stated in German press that the commercial failure "hurt his soul" because of all the work he and his co-workers put into the film. Gansel attributed the failure to the film opening the same week as The Twilight Saga: Eclipse and not being able to compete with such an established franchise. The film fared better on DVD. Gansel has said he did not regret making the film and that it was "definitely worth making".

See also
 Vampire film

References

External links
  (German)
  (US)
 
 
 

2010 films
2010 horror films
2010s feminist films
2010 LGBT-related films
2010s supernatural horror films
Cultural depictions of Valerie Solanas
Films about immortality
Films directed by Dennis Gansel
Films set in Berlin
Films shot in Berlin
German LGBT-related films
German supernatural horror films
2010s German-language films
LGBT-related horror films
German vampire films
2010s German films